Thomas Jan Benjamin Puskailer (born March 2, 1981) known as Thomas Puskailer is a Dutch-born Slovak singer, songwriter and stage actor. He grew up in the Netherlands and performed across Europe and abroad in musicals, concerts, television shows and series.

Puskailer became prominent after appearing on the first season of Czech & Slovak Superstar. Although he was a finalist, Puskailer launched a music career with the release of his studio début album Make Believe in (2012) after signing with the label Championship Music in Prague. Puskailer took also executive producer credit and was a principal writer on this album. Thomas has established a fanbase in Central Europe.

Early life
Thomas Puskailer was born in Lichtenvoorde on March 2, 1981, to Gabriela Katarina Puskailer, dentist and Slovak photographer Bohumil Jan Puskailer. In 1968 his parents emigrated from Slovakia to Canada where his sister Michaela and brother Patrick were born. in 1975 they moved to the Netherlands where his brother Alan and Philip were born. The family grew up on the border of Germany, meaning he learnt several languages, including Dutch, German, English and Slovak from a very young age. Thomas is the youngest of five. As he grew up, he started to sing in church choirs and attended classes in piano, drums, guitar, saxophone, dance and singing.

Puskailer went to school in Germany and became heavily involved with the amateur music and theater productions, and performed main parts in many school musicals. He then went on to train professionally at the "Lucia Marthas Dance Academy", for three years in Amsterdam. During his studies he worked as a backing dancer and singer for many pop groups and also acted in the well known soap opera "Onderweg Naar Morgen" he took on the role of Vladimir Valikov. During this period various modeling agencies also discovered him and he became the face of several campaigns. He became in 2011 the face of the toothbrush Soladey Eco as he is a known supporter of environmental living.

Career

2011: Maxi single
Prior to the début album, "Make Believe", being released, Puskailer released a "Maxi single" in December 2011, consisting of three songs "Sitting on a Cloud", "By your Side" and "Life is Good". The first two tracks, "Sitting on a Cloud" and "By Your Side" are co-written with UK based producer Joe Dworniak in Riverfish Studios. The third track, "Life is Good", was written and composed by Puskailer. The songs were finished and mastered in the production studios "Creative Music House" in Slovakia.

Two singles of the "Maxi Single" have been officially released. The first to be heard 'on air', was "Sitting on a Cloud", which premiered on Fun Radio in Slovakia on August 4, 2012. The second single "By your Side" came next, accompanied with a full music video, On March 3, 2012. All 3 songs are included in the debut album "Make Believe".

2012: Make Believe
Make Believe was the début solo album which incorporated elements of pop, dance & club genres and collaborated with a wide range of urban producers. The songs "Make Believe" and "Artificial Light" are written by Grammy award-winning New York producer Bill Grainer. "Sitting on a Cloud", "By your Side", "Cappuccino" and "Moneytree (Miroslav Vrlik Remix)" are co-written with UK based producer Joe Dworniak. The final tracks were produced in the recordings studios "Creative Music House" in Bratislava, Slovak Republic.

On August 2, 2012, Puskailer released his single "Moneytree (Miroslav Vrlik Remix)" from his début album and it reached No. 1 on See Jay Radio Dance Charts for seven weeks.

2012: ECO TOUR (Environmental Education Show)
Thomas is also touring through the whole of Slovakia with ECO TOUR an ecological entertainment extravaganza created entirely by Thomas. He will continue to combine his musical talents whilst spreading the ECO message! In collaboration with amazing sponsors and supporters Thomas was able to reach schools and children who were never able to experience such an amazing, entertaining and also educational experience. The ECO TOUR show is an educational theatre show for young children and teenagers incorporating music, games, interaction and important ecological messages. ECO TOUR is a major hit with schools and culture centers across the country and will continue indefinitely.

Discography

Albums

Singles

Music videos

Concert Tours
2012: Eco Tour

References

1981 births
Living people
21st-century Slovak male singers
Idols (franchise) participants
People from Lichtenvoorde